Helligan may refer to:

Helligan, a manor house in St Mabyn, Cornwall
Helen Helligan, a character in the DC Comics Shining Knight books
John Helligan, MP for Liskeard (UK Parliament constituency)

See also
 Halligan (disambiguation)